Lestyukhin is a rural locality (a khutor) in Preobrazhenskoye Rural Settlement, Kikvidzensky District, Volgograd Oblast, Russia. The population was 22 as of 2010.

Geography 
Lestyukhin is located in steppe, on Khopyorsko-Buzulukskaya plain, on the right bank of the Karman River, 13 km southwest of Preobrazhenskaya (the district's administrative centre) by road. Shiryayevsky is the nearest rural locality.

References 

Rural localities in Kikvidzensky District